Ivan Dineen (born 5 July 1987) is a former Irish rugby union player. He played as a centre or wing.

Munster
Dineen made his debut against Treviso in October 2010. He scored his first try for Munster against Ulster, also in October 2010. He started for Munster A in their 31-12 2011–12 British and Irish Cup Final victory against Cross Keys, scoring Munster's second try. Dineen was added to Munster's 2012–13 Heineken Cup squad in March 2013. He signed a two-year contract extension with Munster in early April 2013.

Dineen made his European debut on 25 January 2015, coming off the bench against Sale Sharks to replace the injured Denis Hurley in Round 6 of the 2014-15 European Rugby Champions Cup. In June 2015, it was announced that Dineen would be leaving Munster.

References

External links
Munster Profile

Living people
1987 births
People educated at Christian Brothers College, Cork
Rugby union players from County Cork
Irish rugby union players
University College Cork RFC players
Cork Constitution players
Munster Rugby players
Rugby union centres
Rugby union wings